Neds Corner Station is a 30,000 ha nature reserve owned by the Trust for Nature. It is a former sheep grazing property on a pastoral lease abutting the Murray River and the Murray-Sunset National Park in the Mallee region of north-western Victoria, south-eastern Australia.

History
The station was established in 1849 by Edward Meade ('Ned') Bagot, son of Charles Hervey Bagot, a wealthy South Australian pastoralist and parliamentarian. Bagot first visited the area in late 1847 when he retrieved the body of his friend Fred Handcock, a fellow pastoralist who drowned nearby. Bagot started by grazing cattle but soon switched to sheep, using riverboats on the Murray to transport the wool. The property was named after Ned, a shepherd on the property. In 1876 the lease was sold to Robert Barr Smith. In 1920 the lease was taken over by the Neds Corner Pastoral Company. In 1946 the lease was sold again to the Kidman Pastoral Company, owned by Sir Sidney Kidman. In 2002 it was purchased by the Trust for Nature to be managed for conservation.

Description
The reserve lies at the confluence of the arid and semi-arid zones.  It contains strips of River Red Gum forest and Black Box floodplain woodlands along the Murray and its associated wetlands.  Much of the rest of the property consists of flat alluvial plains with mallee woodlands, chenopod shrublands, semi-arid grasslands and ephemeral lignum wetlands.

See also
Barkindji Biosphere Reserve

References

Nature reserves in Victoria (Australia)
Mallee (Victoria)
Stations (Australian agriculture)
1849 establishments in Australia
2002 establishments in Australia